Tashi Tsering also called Tashi Tsering Josayma; born in 1960, is a Tibetan tibetologist, historian and writer.

Biography 

Tashi Tsering was born in 1960. He is a founding director of the Amnye Machen Institute. He is also affiliated with the Library of Tibetan Works and Archives, and editor of several Tibetan journals, including the Journal of Tibet.

Tashi Tsering studied at the Central School for Tibetans Dalhousie in northern India from 1963 to 1971. He studied the history of Tibet, Tibetan literature and Buddhism with Khetsun Sangpo Rinpoche, Dzogchen Khenpo Thubten Phuntsok Rinpoche and Rai Bahadur Burmiok Athing.

He also received teachings from the 14th Dalai Lama and other important teachers such as the 16th Karmapa, Dilgo Khyentse Rinpoche, the 4th Dodrupchen Rinpoche, the 4th Garje Khamtrul Rinpoche and Khunu Geshe Rigzin Tempa.

He was appointed consultant to the Namgyal Institute of Tibetology by its director, Tashi Densapa.

In 1979, along with the filmmaker Tenzing Sonam, late writer, K. Dhondup, Thupten Samphel, Kesang Tenzin and Gyalpo Tsering, he founded the pioneering English-language Tibetan poetry journal, Lotus Fields.

In the documentary Angry Monk, reflections on Tibet (2005) about Gendun Chophel directed by Luc Schaedler, he is interviewed as an expert.

He compiled the longest calligraphy of Tibetan prayers, conducted by the calligrapher Jamyang Dorjee Chakrishar.

He received several awards from the Tibetan community.

Publications 
  The Life of Rev. G. Tharchin: Missionary and Pioneer, in (ed Jamyang Norbu), Christian missionaries and Tibet, (Lungta No 11) Amnye Machen Institute (Dharamsāla, India), 1998  
  Avec Isabelle Henrion-Dourcy, The singing mask: echoes of Tibetan opera, Amnye Machen Institute, 2001
  Cosmogony and the origins, Amnye Machen Institute, Dharamsāla, India,  2004, 
  Éditeur de Aspects of Tibetan History (ouvrage collectif : Tashi Tsering; Roberto Vitali; Dan Martin; Leonard W J van der Kuijp; Elliot Sperling), Amnye Machen Institute, 2001, 
  Éditeur de Si-tu Paṇ-chen : his contribution and legacy (ouvrage collectif : Tashi Tsering; E Gene Smith; Elliot Sperling; Franz-Karl Ehrhard); Amnye Machen Institute, 2000, 
  Yumtsho, Journal of Tibetan Women's Studies

References 

Tibetologists
Tibetan writers
Tibetan historians
1960 births
Living people